"Weekends Are Not My Happy Days" is an English-language single by Latvian pop rock band Brainstorm and is the first track on their 1999 debut English album Among the Suns was released in May 1999. The song peaked at #13 in Belgium.

Track listing 
"Weekends Are Not My Happy Days" - 3:33
"Weekends Are Not My Happy Days" (Instrumental) - 4:02
"Weekends Are Not My Happy Days" (album version) - 4:02
"The Winter" - 2:49

References

Credits 
 Reynard Cowper - writer, producer
 Lars Nissen - arranger, mixer

1999 singles
1999 songs
Songs written by Renārs Kaupers
EMI Records singles
Brainstorm (Latvian band) songs